A Novice at X-Rays was an 1898 French short silent film by Georges Méliès. It was sold by Méliès's Star Film Company and is numbered 142 in its catalogues.

It may have been inspired by The X-Rays, an 1897 British film by the pioneering showman G. A. Smith, which in turn was likely partly inspired by previous films by Méliès. A Novice at X-Rays is currently presumed lost.

References

External links
 

French black-and-white films
Films directed by Georges Méliès
French silent short films
1898 short films
1890s French films